Heptateuchos may refer to:

Heptateuch, the first sevent books of the Hebrew Bible
Heptateuchos, a rendition of the Heptateuch in Latin epic verse by Cyprianus Gallus